Nada R. Sanders is an American university professor specializing in forecasting and supply-chain management. She is the Distinguished Professor of Supply Chain Management at the D’Amore-McKim School of Business at Northeastern University. She is also a research scholar, academic editor, reference book author, keynote speaker, business consultant, and corporate board member. Her forecasts describing the impact of the economic crisis on supply disruptions resulting from the COVID-19 pandemic received media coverage. Her latest book The Humachine (co-authored with John D. Wood) explores the influence of artificial intelligence over world business and culture.

Education 
Sanders' university degrees include PhD in operations management and logistics from the Fisher College of Business, Ohio State University, also an MBA and a BS in mechanical engineering.

Career 
Sanders has successively been the West Chair at the Neely School of Business at Texas Christian University (2007–2009), Iacocca Chair of Supply Chain Management at Lehigh University (2009–2014), and Distinguished Professor of Supply Chain Management at the D’Amore-McKim School of Business at Northeastern University (2014 to present).

Her research has centered on topics such as forecasting methods, management technologies, and resilience of supply chains, her works being commonly cited by subject reviews, and referred as reading in university courses covering these matters. Her research is cited in current Wikipedia entries on Forecasting, Global value chain, Electronic business, Logistics, Operations management. Procurement, Supply chain, and Supply chain management.

In 1996, Sanders was ranked among major contributors to the field of production and operations management in the US in preceding years, according to a study from the David Eccles School of Business, University of Utah. She has been a keynote speaker at conferences in her specialties-

As an institutional executive, she has served as a President of the Production and Operations Management Society (POMS, 2019), a Fellow and vice-president of Decision Sciences Institute, a member of the Board of Economic Advisors of the Association of Industries of Massachusetts (AIM), and a member of the Board of Consultants of the International Institute of Forecasters (IIF).

As an editor, Sanders is a member of the editorial boards of several academic journals, among them the Journal of Business Logistics, the Journal of Supply Chain Management, and Production and Operations Management. She has also been a co-editor of several special journal issues, including "Big Data Driven Supply Chain Management" (Production and Operations Management, 2017), "Big Data Driven Forecasting in Supply Chain Management" (International Journal of Forecasting, 2017),  "Perspectives on Big Data" (Operations Management, 2018), "Sustainable Supply Chains in a Digital Interconnected World," (Journal of Business Logistics, 2019), and "Using Interdisciplinary Research to Address Contemporary SCM Problems" (Journal of Business Logistics, 2016).

Works

Papers 
Sanders has published over 120 articles in peer-reviewed academic journals which have been cited over 6,400 times; her most cited papers are:

  Cited by 572 Related articles (Oct 2021).
  Cited by 536 Related articles (Oct 2021).
  Cited by 365 Related articles (Oct 2021).

Her most recent articles refer to the impact of Artificial intelligence on business and supply chains:

Books 

 
 
 
 
 
 
 . Favorably reviewed by Garth Thomas.

Honors 
 Fellow, Decision Science Institute (2008)
 Named Eunice and James L. West Chair and Professor in Supply Chain Management, Neeley School of Business, Texas Christian University, (2007–2009)
 Carl & Ingeborg Beidleman Research Award in Business & Economics (Leigh University, 2012)
 Named Iacocca Chair and Professor of Supply Chain Management, Lehigh University (2009–2014)

References

External links 
 

Living people
Franklin University alumni
Northeastern University faculty
Ohio State University Fisher College of Business alumni
Year of birth missing (living people)
American women academics
Texas Christian University faculty
Lehigh University faculty
21st-century American women